Executive Order 13987, officially titled Organizing and Mobilizing the United States Government to Provide a Unified and Effective Response to Combat COVID-19 and to Provide United States Leadership on Global Health and Security, is the third executive order signed by U.S. President Joe Biden on January 20, 2021. The order indicates that the federal government will respond to the COVID-19 Pandemic in a more coordinated manner and that federal rules would be published in the near future.

Provisions 
Within the Executive Office of the President, this order established the positions of Coordinator of the COVID-19 Response and Counselor to the President (COVID-19 Response Coordinator) and the position of the Deputy Coordinator of the COVID-19 Response within the Executive Office of the President. The COVID-19 Response Coordinator will report directly to the President and advise, assist in responding to COVID-19, coordinate all the elements for the COVID-19 Reaction, fulfill other tasks under the direction of the president, including the reduction of disparities between COVID-19 Response and treatment. The order further orders the assistant to the President for National Security Affairs to assemble the National Security Council Principals Committee to coordinate the activities of the federal government to deal with and advise the President on the worldwide response and recuperation from COVID-19. The Order establishes a National Security Council Directorate on Global Health Security and Biodefense. Finally, the Order requires heads of agencies to raise the COVID-19 response obstacles to the attention of the COVID-19 Response Coordinator, which, when required, the President will provide guidance.

The Order established the White House COVID-19 Response Team.

Effects 
The Order is concerned with employment since the role of Coordinator of the COVID-19 Response and presidential advisor directly influences the norms established for companies to follow in the aftermath of the epidemic. We will undoubtedly see more and more precise recommendations for PPE, security, policy, and procedural companies as they progress towards more complete openness in the months ahead.

See also 
 List of executive actions by Joe Biden
2020 United States census

References

External links 
 US Presidential Actions
 Federal Register
Executive Order on Ensuring a Lawful and Accurate Enumeration and Apportionment Pursuant to the Decennial Census

2021 in American law
Executive orders of Joe Biden
January 2021 events in the United States